Bianco, rosso e... (internationally released as White Sister and The Sin) is a 1972 Italian comedy film directed by Alberto Lattuada. The film was a commercial success.

Cast 
 Sophia Loren as Sister Germana
 Adriano Celentano as Annibale Pezzi
 Fernando Rey as Il primario
 Juan Luis Galiardo as Guido
 Giuseppe Maffioli as Dr. Arrighi
 Luis Marín as Brigadiere libico
 Sergio Fasanelli as Dr. Filippini
 Teresa Rabal as Lisa 
 Pilar Gómez Ferrer as Hermana Teresa
 Tina Aumont as Ricci
 Enzo Cannavale as Quinto
 Bruno Scipioni as Chiacchiera 
 Dori Dorika as Dorotea
 Alessandra Mussolini as Sister Germana as a child

References

External links

1972 films
Commedia all'italiana
Films directed by Alberto Lattuada
Italian comedy films
1972 comedy films
Films with screenplays by Ruggero Maccari
Films shot in Almería
1970s Italian-language films
1970s Italian films